Åsmund Forfang (born 22 May 1952) is a Norwegian writer.  He has written several novels, short story collections, and children's books. He has also issued two non-fiction books, about the mining communities of Kopperå and Løkken Verk.

References

20th-century Norwegian novelists
21st-century Norwegian novelists
Norwegian male short story writers
Norwegian non-fiction writers
Nynorsk-language writers
1952 births
Living people
20th-century Norwegian short story writers
21st-century Norwegian short story writers
20th-century Norwegian male writers
21st-century Norwegian male writers
Male non-fiction writers